General elections were held in Seychelles on 22–24 October 2020 to elect the President and members of the National Assembly. The National Assembly elections had been due in 2021, but in July 2020 were brought forward by President Danny Faure in order to hold them together with the presidential elections, a proposal supported by opposition parties.

The presidential elections were won by Wavel Ramkalawan of the Linyon Demokratik Seselwa (LDS), with the LDS also increasing its majority in the National Assembly, winning 25 of the 35 seats.

In this election, the first Hindu member of the Seychelles National Assembly, Satya Naidu, was elected.

Electoral system
The President of Seychelles is elected using the two-round system; if no candidate receives a majority of the vote in the first round, a second round is held between the top two candidates.

Members of the National Assembly are elected by two methods; 26 (with a new constituency established in 2020) are elected from single-member constituencies using first-past-the-post voting, and up to a further ten are elected based on the percentage of votes received by each party; for each 10% of the total national vote received, a party gets one additional seat.

Presidential campaign
In August 2019 the United Seychelles Party nominated its leader and incumbent president Danny Faure as its candidate during its thirty-third annual congress. Wavel Ramkalawan from the liberal  Linyon Demokratik Seselwa (LDS) and Alain St. Ange from the progressive One Seychelles Party (founded on 26 April 2019 and registered on 12 June 2019) are challenging the incumbent. While former speaker of national assembly Patrick Pillay sought nomination, the election commission rejected his candidacy on the ground that he failed to collect the required 500 signatures from registered voters.

While the country recorded only 149 (mostly imported) COVID-19 cases, public health directives still impacted the campaign.  For instance, public election rallies were banned. Since there are no active polling institutes, rally attendance had been used to measure support in previous elections.  However, the candidates were active in social media, and also participated in the country's first televised presidential debate.  The economy was a major campaign issue due to the high cost of living and recent reduction in tourism.  While Transparency International ranks Seychelles as one of the 30 least corrupt countries in the world, the incumbent government was considered too accommodating to offshore business interests.

Results
On 25 October, Wavel Ramkalawan was declared the winner of the presidential election with 54.91% of the vote, marking the first peaceful transfer of presidential power between different political parties since independence in 1976. He had run unsuccessfully in the presidential elections from 1998 onward. Danny Faure attended Ramkalawan's victory speech; in his speech, Ramkalawan emphasized reconciliation: "In this election, there were no losers, there were no winners — our country was given the opportunity as the ultimate winner."

President

National Assembly

By constituency

Reactions
: The United States Department of State issued a statement congratulating "the Government of the Republic of Seychelles and the Seychellois people on a successful election." The Department further "congratulate[d] Reverend Wavel Ramkalawan on his election and look[s] forward to expanding cooperation on a wide range of mutual interests."

References

Seychelles
General election
Seychelles general election
Presidential elections in Seychelles